Hunter is a ghost town in Elko County, Nevada.

History
In 1871 lead and silver were found in Hunter. In 1877 a post office was established there. In those days, Hunter had six saloons, a blacksmith shop, restaurants, two stores and 40 to 50 homes. Mines were idle in 1884 but resurged by 1905. In 1872, mines at Hunter produced $208,000 in material. However, the Hunter District had to pay a high tax. Ore was discovered in the area, leading to mines that attracted more attention. This caused the population to reach a peak population of 80 inhabitants in 1877. By these times, Hunter had 40 houses, restaurants, several saloons and a post office. The early years of the 20th century were the start of the end of Hunter. Now, only smelter ruins mark the site of the old town.

References

Ghost towns in Elko County, Nevada
Ghost towns in Nevada